Onitis crenatus, is a species of dung beetle found in Afro-Asian countries.

Description
Male has an average length of about 21 mm. Body bronze-black, shiny. Clypeus with round lateral margin and emarginate apex. Clypeal carina short. Clypeus weakly rugosely punctate. Gena not prominent. Pronotum bordered only anteriorly and laterally and punctured. Elytra with shallow striae. Elytral lateral carina strongly and regularly crenate. Pygidium with weak basal carina. Female is about 17 to 20 mm in length. Clypeus with straight lateral margins.

References 

Scarabaeinae
Insects described in 1847